A Note To You was a radio show featuring classical music, broadcast from 1963 to 2000 from Ryder Hall at Northeastern University, Boston. A Note to You was started by music department founder, Roland Nadeau, who created the show in the interest of educating children on classical music. Initially, the show was broadcast on WHDH but moved to broadcast on WGBH-FM, eventually on more than 160 stations. At its peak, the show was also internationally syndicated to networks like the Armed Forces Radio and Australian Public Radio. Although the show was created with the intent to educate children on classical music, in time A Note to You "grew into a family show where Professor Nadeau would lecture and interview guests and use music to enhance his ideas". Each episode centered on a theme and featured live performance with discussion and commentary, with Nadeau seeking to present in a non-elitist style.

Hosts

Roland Nadeau 
Roland Nadeau founded and hosted A Note to You for 34 years before his death in 1997.

Virginia Eskin
Virginia Eskin was a frequent Note to You guest, until she succeeded Nadeau as host in 1998.  She was a Visiting Artist in Northeastern University's Department of Music in 2007.

Timeline

See also 
 Northeastern University
 WGBH-FM
 WGDH

References

Bibliography 

  

  

  

  

  

  

  

  

  

 

1963 radio programme debuts
2000 radio programme endings
American classical music radio programs
American children's radio programs
English-language radio programs